Charles Baxter Quarterman (born 6 September 1998) is a British cyclist, who currently rides for UCI ProTeam .

Career
For the 2017 season he joined the Luxembourg-based team .

He won the Under-23 British National Time Trial Championships in 2019.

In August 2019, Quarterman joined UCI WorldTeam  as a stagiaire for the second half of the season, before joining the team permanently in 2020.

Personal
Quarterman was educated at the Abingdon School from 2010 to 2017 and is now based near Annecy, France.

Major results

2016
 1st  Mountains classification, Junior Tour of Wales
 3rd Overall Giro di Basilicata
 5th Omloop der Vlaamse Gewesten
 6th Grand Prix Bati-Metallo
2018
 2nd Time trial, National Under-23 Road Championships
2019
 1st  Time trial, National Under-23 Road Championships
2022
 5th Time trial, National Road Championships
 7th Overall Tour de Normandie

See also
 List of Old Abingdonians

References

External links

1998 births
Living people
British male cyclists
English male cyclists
People educated at Abingdon School
Sportspeople from Oxford